The Big River, a perennial river of the North-East Murray catchment of the Murray-Darling basin, is located in the East Gippsland and Alpine regions of Victoria, Australia. It flows from the northern slopes of Falls Creek in the Australian Alps, joining with the Cobungra River near Anglers Rest to form the Mitta Mitta River.

Course
The river flows north off Spion Kopje, then east in the valley between Spion Kopje and Victoria's highest peak, Mount Bogong, separating Mount Bogong itself from the Bogong High Plains.

Shortly downstream from this, near Anglers Rest, the Big River forms its confluence with the Cobungra River, with the two rivers becoming the Mitta Mitta River, itself a tributary of the Murray River. The river descends  over its  course.

Tributaries
Key tributaries of the Big River include Cairn Creek, Beckraith Creek, Camp Creek, Hollonds Creek, Dead Horse Creek, Middle Creek, Glen Wills Creek, Wallaby Creek, Burnside Creek, and the Bundara River. The main tributaries flow off the northern slopes of Spion Kopje, the southern slopes of Mount Bogong, the north, east, and west slopes of Mount Nelse and Mount Nelse North, the eastern slopes of Mount Cope, and the western slopes of Mount Wills and The Knocker.

River health

Most of the waterways in the Mitta Mitta sub-catchment basin are recognised as being in good to excellent condition. Extensive forest covers much of the catchment area. Despite some land clearing and livestock damage to river banks, the aquatic habitat is generally very good. The upper Big River above the Glen Valley is classified as a "Representative River of East Victorian dissected uplands".

In early 2003, large areas of forest around the Big River and its catchments were severely impacted by the Eastern Victorian alpine bushfires. The damage resulting from the fires impacted river health for some time after the fires.

See also

References

External links
 

North-East catchment
Rivers of Gippsland (region)
Tributaries of the Murray River
Victorian Alps